Leon Parris (born 1 February 1981) is a British writer, composer, musician, and actor.

Biography
Leon Parris was brought up in Bedford, England, and was educated at Bedford Modern School.

Musical theatre 
 Bananaman (London, 2017)
 Scary Musical – standIN'OVATION, Belfast (2009)
 Scary Musical – standIN'OVATION, Waterfront Hall, Belfast (2010)
 Epic Musical – standIN' OVATION, Belfast (2010)
 The Famous Five – Tabard Theatre in Chiswick, directed by Russell Labey (2009)
 Wolfboy – adaptation of Brad Fraser play, directed by Russell Labey, previews at Tabard Theatre and run at Edinburgh Fringe Festival (2009)
Wolfboy - off-West End staging at Trafalgar Studios London (2010)
 Stig of the Dump - directed by Russell Labey (2008)
 Monte Cristo  - with Jon Smith, Birmingham Hippodrome (2005)
 The Fallen - Bedford Modern School (1999)

Awards, bursaries, and nominations 
 2000 Winner – The Vivian Ellis Award for Best Musical: Going Once (2000)
 2000 Winner – The Really Useful Group Award for Most Promising Young Writer: Going Once (2000)
 2000 Winner – The Warner Chappell Award
 2000 Winner – The Mercury Workshops Award
 2001 Recipient – £10,000 Cameron Mackintosh Bursary

Acting roles

References

External links 
 Youth Music Theatre UK
 Monte Cristo – The Musical
 Scary Musical

1981 births
Living people
People educated at Bedford Modern School
British writers